Dandan noodles or dandanmian, literally "carrying-pole noodles",  is a noodle dish originating from Chinese Sichuan cuisine. It consists of a spicy sauce usually containing preserved vegetables (often including zha cai, lower enlarged mustard stems, or ya cai, upper mustard stems), chili oil, Sichuan pepper, minced pork, and scallions served over noodles. The dish can either be served dry or as a noodle soup.

The  originated in Chengdu, the capital of Sichuan province. The original dish is served with no soup in a small bowl covered in a  meat sauce and pickled vegetables, with peanuts and spring onions served on top. The soup variant is from Hong Kong and is more widespread across the rest of China but it is uncommon in Sichuan itself where the authentic style dominates. 

Sesame paste or peanut butter is sometimes added, and occasionally replaces the spicy sauce, usually in the American Chinese style of the dish.

Origin and name
The name refers to a type of carrying pole that was used by walking street vendors who sold the dish to passers-by. The pole was carried over the shoulder, with two baskets containing noodles and sauce attached at either end. As the noodles were affordable due to their low cost, the local people gradually came to call them  noodles, referencing the street vendors. The name translates directly as 'noodles carried on a pole', but may be better translated as 'peddler's noodles'.

A variety of English spellings are used. The first word may be either dandan, dundun or tantan, and the last word may also be spelled mein (Cantonese pronunciation).

Related dishes

The same sauce is frequently served over poached chicken (called  or  chicken), and on steamed, meat-filled dumplings in another Sichuan dish called suanla chaoshou.

See also
 Chinese noodles
 List of Chinese dishes
 Ta-a noodles

References

External links

 Authentic Dan Dan Mian recipe at KitchenChick.com
 Americanized Dan-Dan Noodles at FoodNetwork.com

Chinese noodle dishes
Sichuan cuisine
Hong Kong noodle dishes
Spicy foods